"Undun" is a song recorded by Canadian rock group The Guess Who. It spent two weeks at #21 on the Canadian Singles Chart in November–December 1969 and reached #15 on the U.S. adult contemporary chart and #22 on the Billboard Hot 100.

It was written by Randy Bachman after hearing Bob Dylan's "Ballad in Plain D", which included the phrase "she was easily undone". Bachman's song tells the story of a girl he had seen at a party who, after consuming LSD, slipped into a coma. The song takes its structure from new jazz guitar chords Bachman had learned from his friend and neighbour Lenny Breau. During the Guess Who's 2000 reunion tour, Running Back Thru Canada, Bachman's former bandmate Burton Cummings declared the song to be one of Bachman's finest compositions and "one of the best songs ever written by any Canadian songwriter". Bachman himself has stated that "Undun" is his favourite song from his time as a member of The Guess Who.

The original 4:17 version of "Undun", complete with a country guitar section at the end, appeared on The Guess Who's 1969 album, Canned Wheat, and an edit was initially released as the B-side of the single "Laughing" which peaked on August 23, 1969. The song gained popularity when disc jockeys started turning the "Laughing" record over.

Cultural extension
The song plays in the background of a fight scene between Robert De Niro and Bridget Fonda in Quentin Tarantino's 1997 film Jackie Brown.

Numerous jazz and other musicians have recorded "Undun". These include Hennie Bekker, Steve Cole, The Phil Dwyer Septet, Kurt Elling, Ranee Lee, Sophie Milman, Hugo Montenegro, and Alexander Zonjic.

Personnel
Burton Cummings – vocals, flute
Randy Bachman – guitar
Jim Kale – bass
Garry Peterson – drums

Charts

References

External links
 
 
 

1969 songs
1969 singles
Songs written by Randy Bachman
The Guess Who songs
Hugo Montenegro songs
Song recordings produced by Jack Richardson (record producer)
Songs about drugs
RCA Victor singles